Adam Michael Hasner (born November 25, 1969) is an American attorney and politician who served as a member of the Florida House of Representatives from 2002 to 2010. In 2012, Hasner was the Republican nominee for Florida's 22nd congressional district.

Early life and education 
Hasner was born in the Brooklyn borough of New York City. He earned a bachelor's degree from the University of Maryland in 1991, where he was a member of Phi Delta Theta. He received his Juris Doctor from Florida State University in 1995.

Career
Hasner was selected to serve as the Deputy Majority Leader of the Florida House of Representatives by then-Speaker Marco Rubio in 2007 and promoted by Rubio to Majority Leader later that year. He was the first legislator from Palm Beach County to hold the position in more than 50 years, and the first Jewish Republican Majority Leader.

During his eight years in office, Hasner was regarded as one of the most conservative legislators in the Florida House. This led to criticism from Florida Democrats, who attacked Hasner for among other things voting against additional stimulus spending in Florida. Hasner was videotaped describing himself as "the most partisan Republican in Tallahassee."

In 2010, Hasner led the House Republican effort demanding the United States Congress pass a balanced budget amendment to the U.S. Constitution. Hasner currently serves as national Co-Chairman of the citizen action group, Pass The Balanced Budget Amendment.

2012 U.S. Senate election
On March 14, 2011, The Washington Post reported that Republican lawyer and conservative activist Cleta Mitchell filed the necessary paperwork on behalf of Hasner to officially begin exploring the Republican Primary for the United States Senate in Florida. On April 25, 2011, Hasner officially announced he was running for Senate on Mark Levin's radio show,.

On September 23, Hasner won the CPAC-FL straw poll, with 34% of the vote, compared to 30% for Mike McCalister and 24% for George LeMieux.

On February 1, 2012, Hasner ended his bid for U.S. Senate to instead run for U.S. House of Representatives in Florida's 22nd Congressional District.

2012 congressional election
Hasner announced on February 1, 2012, that he would end his campaign for U.S. Senate in Florida and instead run for United States House of Representatives in Florida's 22nd Congressional District, which includes many of the coastal communities of Broward and Palm Beach Counties that he represented in the Florida House of Representatives.

Hasner was endorsed by U.S. Senator Marco Rubio, Former Florida Governor Jeb Bush, House Majority Leader Eric Cantor and Congressman Allen West.

Hasner lost the general election to former West Palm Beach mayor Lois Frankel.

Frankel defeated Hasner by a margin of 55% to 45%.

References

External links

Official Bio for Representative Hasner
Adam Hasner campaign site

|-

Florida State University College of Law alumni
Republican Party members of the Florida House of Representatives
1969 births
Living people
Politicians from Brooklyn
People from Delray Beach, Florida
University of Maryland, College Park alumni
Jewish American state legislators in Florida
21st-century American politicians
Candidates in the 2012 United States elections
21st-century American Jews